Adi Shankaracharya, Ramanujacharya and Madhvacharya are considered to be the pillars of Vedantic tradition of spiritual India.

Shankaracharya proposed or rather popularized Advaitha Vedanta. Advaitha system of Vedanta was first proposed by Gaudapada who was the Guru of Shankaracharya's Guru Govinda Bhagavatpada. Advaitha means non-dual.

Ramanujacharya had a totally different experience than Shankaracharya. During the time of Ramanuja, followers of Advaitha tradition in Tamil Nadu had distorted the teachings of Shankaracharya so much that Ramanuja started correcting them.

Madhvacharya's work is the most interesting of the three. He took a daring step of explaining Prasthanatraya in the light of Dvaitha philosophy that is philosophically against Advaitha and Vishishtadvaitha.

Advaitin philosophers
Ancient Indian philosophers
Indian Hindu monks
Hindu philosophers and theologians
Sanskrit writers